3D security is a framework promoting development, diplomacy, and defense as security strategies.

The 3D security framework recognizes that security challenges like terrorism, nuclear proliferation, global warming, and SARS or Avian Flu epidemics require a variety of tools in addressing complex threats. These tools can be categorized broadly under the headings of Development, Diplomacy and Defense; the 3Ds of security.

3D security or “whole of government” approaches have been promoted by countries like Canada and the U.K. for a number of years. Now bi-partisan Congressional leaders and the Bush administration promote 3D security as a new vision for rethinking security as detailed in the 2006 National Security Strategy.

Development refers to governmental and nongovernmental (NGO) efforts to build the economic, social, and political foundations of stable communities and societies. Diplomacy refers to communication or negotiation between people to solve shared problems and address conflicts through political and legal channels. Official State Department negotiations (Track I) and unofficial diplomacy (Track II) between religious, business, academic, or other civil society leaders work best on parallel tracks resulting in agreements that are legitimate, widely supported, and sustainable. Defense refers to a wide range of military tasks including waging war, peacekeeping or coordinating disaster response.

Resources 
Defense, Development, and Diplomacy (3D): Canadian and U.S. Military Perspectives

Security engineering
National security policies